Christian Pouga (born 19 June 1986) is a Cameroonian professional footballer who plays as a striker for SA Mamertins in the Division d'Honneur in France.

Career

Early years
Pouga started off his professional footballing career with Shanghai United F.C. of the Chinese first division.

Pouga then went to play his trade in Switzerland, he spent two successful years at FC Zürich and FC Aarau respectively.

It was when Pouga stepped down a division where he really shone, playing for AC Bellinzona of the Swiss second division, and in his first year with the club he helped the club gain promotion to the top flight of Swiss football by scoring 18 goals in 32 appearances.

Sevilla B
On 20 June 2008 Pouga was sold to Sevilla FC from AC Bellinzona for an undisclosed fee.

Leixões
On 18 July 2009, Pouga was loaned by Sevilla to Leixões SC, of the Portuguese League, for one year. Later on, the deal became permanent.

Vaslui
On 9 August 2010, Pouga signed with the Romanian club FC Vaslui for three years.

Marítimo
In June 2011, Pouga has started playing for CS Marítimo.

PS Kemi
On 14 July 2016, Pouga signed a two-year contract with PS Kemi, but left 2-weeks later for personal reasons.

References

1986 births
Living people
Cameroonian footballers
FC Zürich players
AC Bellinzona players
FC Aarau players
Leixões S.C. players
FC Vaslui players
C.S. Marítimo players
Oud-Heverlee Leuven players
Lierse S.K. players
Ankaraspor footballers
Boavista F.C. players
Liga I players
Belgian Pro League players
Primeira Liga players
China League One players
Expatriate footballers in Belgium
Expatriate footballers in China
Expatriate footballers in Finland
Expatriate footballers in France
Expatriate footballers in Iraq
Expatriate footballers in Malta
Expatriate footballers in Portugal
Expatriate footballers in Romania
Expatriate footballers in Switzerland
Expatriate footballers in Turkey
Cameroonian expatriate sportspeople in Belgium
Cameroonian expatriate sportspeople in China
Cameroonian expatriate sportspeople in Finland
Cameroonian expatriate sportspeople in France
Cameroonian expatriate sportspeople in Iraq
Cameroonian expatriate sportspeople in Malta
Cameroonian expatriate sportspeople in Portugal
Cameroonian expatriate sportspeople in Romania
Cameroonian expatriate sportspeople in Switzerland
Cameroonian expatriate sportspeople in Turkey
Association football forwards